Pachnephorus demeyeri is a species of leaf beetle found in the Democratic Republic of the Congo, described by Stefano Zoia in 2007. It is named after Marc de Meyer, for helping Zoia during his visits to the Royal Museum for Central Africa.

References

Eumolpinae
Beetles of the Democratic Republic of the Congo
Beetles described in 2007
Endemic fauna of the Democratic Republic of the Congo